Caroline or Carolyn Moore may refer to:

 Caroline Moore (academic), English urologist
 Caroline Moore (astronomer) (born 1994), American discoverer of Supernova 2008ha
 Carolyn Conn Moore (1904–1986), American politician
 Caroline Ellen Moore (1882–1956), Australian actress